Chryseobacterium daeguense  is a Gram-negative and rod-shaped bacteria from the genus of Chryseobacterium which has been isolated from wastewater from a textile dye works in Daegu in Korea.

References

Further reading

External links
Type strain of Chryseobacterium daeguense at BacDive -  the Bacterial Diversity Metadatabase

daeguense
Bacteria described in 2007